Smouha Sporting Club, commonly known simply as Smouha, is an Egyptian professional basketball club from Alexandria. The club competes in the Egyptian Super League, the highest national level.

In the 2018–19 season, Smouha made its debut in the FIBA Africa Basketball League.

Honours

International
FIBA Africa Basketball League
Third place (1): 2018–19

In African competitions
FIBA Africa Basketball League  (1 appearances)
2018–19 – Third Place

Season by season

References

Basketball teams in Egypt